The Keeper of Entomology was an entomological academic position within the Natural History Museum, London.  The Keeper of Entomology served as the head of the Department of Entomology within the Museum. Originally, the post ranked as an Assistant Keeper to the Keeper of Zoology, known as the Assistant Keeper in Charge of Insects but reorganisation in 1913 saw entomology get its own department. Both are listed below:

Assistant Keepers in Charge of Insects 

Arthur Gardiner Butler 1895–1901
George Francis Hampson (acting) 1901–1905
Charles Owen Waterhouse 1905–1910
Charles Joseph Gahan 1910–1913

Keepers of Entomology 

Charles Joseph Gahan 1913–1927
Ernest Edward Austen 1927–1932
Norman Denbigh Riley 1932–1955
William Edward China 1955–1960
John Priestman Doncaster 1960–1968
Paul Freeman 1968–1981
Laurence Mound 1981–1992
Richard Lane 1992–1997
Rory Post (Acting) 1997–1998
Richard Irwin Vane-Wright 1998–2004
Quentin D. Wheeler 2004–2006
Martin Hall (Acting) 2006
Malcolm Scoble 2006–2010
Andrew Polaszek (Acting) 2010–2012

The Department of Entomology was merged with the Departments of Zoology and Botany in 2012 to form the Department of Life Sciences.

External links
 http://www.nhm.ac.uk/research-curation/library/archives/catalogue/dserve.exe?dsqServer=placid&dsqIni=Dserve.ini&dsqApp=Archive&dsqCmd=Show.tcl&dsqDb=Catalog&dsqPos=6&dsqSearch=%28%28%28text%29=%27keeper%27%29AND%28%28text%29=%27entomology%27%29%29

English entomologists
Natural History Museum, London